

The Sagem Crecerelle ("Kestrel") is a reconnaissance UAV developed in France in the 1990s, based on the Meggitt Banshee target drone. Its configuration is much like that of the Banshee, with a pusher prop, a clipped delta wing, and a single tailfin, though its fuselage is more cylindrical. It is powered by a 20 kW (26 hp) rotary engine and has no landing gear, being recovered by parachute and airbags. The Crecerelle saw action with French forces during the Kosovo campaign in 1999. Meggitt sells much the same machine as the Spectre.

Specifications

References
 Jane's Unmanned Aerial Vehicles and Targets

This article contains material that originally came from the web article Unmanned Aerial Vehicles by Greg Goebel, which exists in the Public Domain.

1990s French military reconnaissance aircraft
Unmanned military aircraft of France
Tailless delta-wing aircraft
Crecerelle